Tool is a city in Henderson County, Texas, United States. The population was 2,175 at the 2020 census. Located on the west side of Cedar Creek Lake, it is a popular second home and retiree destination.

Geography

Tool is located in northwestern Henderson County at  (32.280459, –96.172678), on the west side of Cedar Creek Lake. Texas State Highway 274 is the main road through the city, leading northwest  to Seven Points and southeast  to Trinidad.

Demographics

As of the 2020 United States census, there were 2,175 people, 1,088 households, and 719 families residing in the city.

As of the census of 2000, there were 2,275 people, 1,006 households, and 682 families residing in the city. The population density was 630.6 people per square mile (243.3/km). There were 1,416 housing units at an average density of 392.5 per square mile (151.4/km). The racial makeup of the city was 95.56% White, 0.40% African American, 0.40% Native American, 0.13% Asian, 0.22% Pacific Islander, 1.19% from other races, and 2.11% from two or more races. Hispanic or Latino of any race were 2.33% of the population.

There were 1,006 households, out of which 19.7% had children under the age of 18 living with them, 53.0% were married couples living together, 10.5% had a female householder with no husband present, and 32.2% were non-families. 27.4% of all households were made up of individuals, and 14.9% had someone living alone who was 65 years of age or older. The average household size was 2.26 and the average family size was 2.73.

In the city, the population was spread out, with 19.3% under the age of 18, 5.3% from 18 to 24, 22.7% from 25 to 44, 28.4% from 45 to 64, and 24.3% who were 65 years of age or older. The median age was 47 years. For every 100 females, there were 97.5 males. For every 100 females age 18 and over, there were 94.2 males.

The median income for a household in the city was $32,679, and the median income for a family was $37,396. Males had a median income of $33,534 versus $24,000 for females. The per capita income for the city was $19,507. About 10.8% of families and 15.1% of the population were below the poverty line, including 26.6% of those under age 18 and 7.5% of those age 65 or over.

Education
Tool is served by the Malakoff Independent School District.

References

External links
City of Tool official website

Cities in Henderson County, Texas
Cities in Texas